BBD is the third studio album by American R&B group Bell Biv DeVoe, released in December 2001 through Biv 10 and Universal Records. It's the group's first recording since 1993's Hootie Mack.

Critical reception 

Jason Birchmeier from AllMusic said that despite some decent production, he was put off by the misogynistic slant in the group's brag and floss content, calling it "too harsh and too direct to be sexy […] too one-dimensional to appeal to anyone who is disinterested in hearing three guys channel their frustrations towards submissive, generic women with no voice." He concluded that, "[I]t's perhaps ironic that BBD's comeback album showcases precisely why the general public stopped caring about these guys in the first place. These guys went from "Candy Girl" to "Dance Bitch" and wonder why the masses grew weary." Barry Walters, writing for Vibe, felt the record "sounds more like contract fulfilment than musical inspiration", pointing out the lewd material that was implicit on "Poison" now being explicitly in the forefront, concluding that "the hardcore-playa front BBD erect to mask their pop past is just another bad creation."

Track listing 
Credits adapted from the album's liner notes.

References 

2001 albums
Bell Biv DeVoe albums
Biv 10 Records albums
Albums produced by Dr. Dre
Albums produced by Rockwilder
Albums produced by Timbaland